The Bell Inn is a  pub at the village of Aldworth, in the English county of West Berkshire. It won CAMRA's National Pub of the Year in 1990, and received the accolade again for 2019. It is a Grade II listed building and is the only pub in Berkshire with a Grade II listed interior. It is also on the Campaign for Real Ale's National Inventory of Historic Pub Interiors. 

The pub is built of brick with a timber frame, and is said to have once been a medieval hall house or manor house before it became a pub. It was built in the 15th century or possibly earlier, with C17 and C19 alterations and a C20 addition. It has two rooms, a large panelled tap room with inglenook fireplace and quarry-tiled floor, and a smaller 'L' shaped room. The bar itself is a servery with sliding glass partitions and hatches, and has no bar fittings at all save for ebony handpumps, which were fitted in 1902.

Besides its listing and awards, the pub is also notable for having been owned and run by the same family continuously since the 18th century. The pub is a free house and sells beers from a number of local breweries, as well as its famous filled rolls. It is popular with locals, as well as walkers on the nearby Ridgeway.

References

External links
 
 Description of the pub interior on CAMRA web site

Grade II listed pubs in Berkshire
National Inventory Pubs
Timber framed buildings in England
West Berkshire District